Končar may refer to:
Rade Končar, World War II Yugoslav Communist resistance fighter
John Konchar, American professional basketball player 
KONČAR Group, an electrical engineering company of Croatia
Končar-class missile boat, a class of military ship built for the Yugoslav Navy in the 1970s